Pavel Pimienta Allen (born August 3, 1976) is a retired volleyball player from Cuba. A one-time Olympian (2000), he played as a wing-spiker and won the bronze medal with the Men's National Team at the 1998 World Championship during his career.

Honours
 1997 FIVB World League — 2nd place
 1998 FIVB World League — 1st place
 1999 FIVB World Cup — 2nd place
 1998 World Championship — 3rd place
 1999 FIVB World League — 2nd place
 2000 FIVB World League — 8th place
 2000 Olympic Games — 7th place
 2001 FIVB World League — 5th place
 2001 World Grand Champions Cup — 1st place
 2001 America's Cup — 2nd place
 2002 FIVB World League — 13th place
 2002 World Championship — 19th place
 2003 FIVB World League — 13th place
 2003 Pan American Games — 2nd place
 2005 America's Cup — 3rd place
 2007 NORCECA Championship — 3rd place

References
 FIVB Profile

1976 births
Living people
Cuban men's volleyball players
Place of birth missing (living people)
Volleyball players at the 2000 Summer Olympics
Olympic volleyball players of Cuba
Volleyball players at the 2003 Pan American Games
Volleyball players at the 2007 Pan American Games
Pan American Games silver medalists for Cuba
Pan American Games bronze medalists for Cuba
Pan American Games medalists in volleyball
Medalists at the 2003 Pan American Games
Medalists at the 2007 Pan American Games